Nationality words link to articles with information on the nation's poetry or literature (for instance, Irish or France).

Events

Works published
 Biernat of Lublin, Zywot Ezopa ("The Life of Aesop"), published about this year, Poland
 Robert Copland, Ipomadon, publication year uncertain; derived from the Anglo-Norman Ipomedon (c. 1190) of Hue de Rotelande
 Thomas Murner, Of the Great Lutheran Fool, a verse satire against Martin Luther; the "Great Lutheran fool" is a personification of all those who were misled by Lutheranism; the author's most famous work; Germany

Births
Death years link to the corresponding "[year] in poetry" article:
 Approximate date
 Joachim du Bellay (died 1560), French poet
 Siôn Tudur (died 1602), Welsh language poet

Deaths
Birth years link to the corresponding "[year] in poetry" article:
 June 30 – Johann Reuchlin (born 1455), German humanist scholar and poet
 September – Gavin Douglas (born c. 1474), Scottish poet and bishop

See also

 Poetry
 16th century in poetry
 16th century in literature
 French Renaissance literature
 Renaissance literature
 Spanish Renaissance literature

Notes

16th-century poetry
Poetry